John R. Randolph (May 5, 1918 — October 18, 1983) was an American politician, rancher, and businessman who served in the Wyoming House of Representatives, representing Fremont County as a Republican in 1983 until his death later that year.

Early life and education
Randolph was born in Charles City, Iowa on May 5, 1918. He graduation from Minneapolis Central High School in 1936 and obtained a degree from the University of Minnesota in 1941.

Career
Randolph served in the United States Air Force during World War II. Prior to entering politics, he was a rancher and business executive.

1982 election
In 1982, Randolph was elected to the Wyoming House of Representatives to represent Fremont County as a Republican in the 47th Wyoming Legislature. Randolph assumed office in 1983 and served until his death later that same year. 

During his time in office, Randolph served on the following standing committees.
Corporations, Elections and Political Subdivisions
Travel, Recreation and Wildlife
On November 8, 1983, Republican Bob Baker was appointed to serve out the remainder of Randolph's term.

Personal life and death
On June 5, 1964, Randolph married Bess Hackler in Dallas, Texas, with whom he had four children.

On October 18, 1983, Randolph died of a heart attack in Dubois, Wyoming at the age of 65.

Notes

References

External links
Official page at the Wyoming Legislature

1918 births
1983 deaths
20th-century American politicians
Republican Party members of the Wyoming House of Representatives
Ranchers from Wyoming
University of Minnesota alumni
People from Charles City, Iowa